Adam-Pierre de La Grené (1625–1702) was a Belgian dancer.

1625 births
1702 deaths
Belgian male dancers
17th-century dancers